Jo Chale To Jaan Se Guzar Gaye is a Pakistani drama television serial premiered on Geo TV on 19 September 2011. The serial is directed by Nadeem Siddiqi, written by Maha Malik, and produced by Asif Raza Mir & Babar Javed under their banner A&B Entertainment.

Plot
The story of Jo Chale To Jaan Se Guzar Gaye revolves around Zufishan (Saba Qamar) who is from a middle-class background. She has been engaged to her cousin Azar (Sami Khan) and is strongly in love with him. All of a sudden Sayed Alim Shah (Noman Ijaz) a landlord saw her and fell in love with her. He forced Zufishan to marry him, but she refuses as she is engaged to her cousin.

Sayed Alam Shah kidnapped Azar and blackmail Zufishan to marry him. After all Zufishan decided to marry Sayed Alam Shah and he releases Azar. She did not even tell the whole story to Azar and marry Alam Shah while Azay was out of country. In an accident Alam Shah loses his legs. With the passage of time Zufishan starts loving her husband and story moves on. When Azar gets the real facts about her marriage, he gets shocked and asks Zulfishan to get divorce from him but she refuses. At the end, Alam shah suicided by taking poison and azar got zulfishan again.

Cast
 Noman Ijaz as Sayed Alam Shah
 Sami Khan as Azar
 Saba Qamar as Zufishan
 Qavi Khan 
 Kashif Mehmood 
 Jana Malik
 Farhana Maqsood

References

External links

Pakistani drama television series
Urdu-language television shows
Geo TV original programming